Kenneth Riegel (born 19 April 1938) is an American opera tenor.

Life and career
Riegel was born on 19 April 1938 in Womelsdorf, Pennsylvania. He made his theatrical début as the Alchemist in König Hirsch at Santa Fe Opera in 1965, debuting at the Royal Opera House, Covent Garden in the same year.
He was engaged at the New York City Opera from 1969 (debut in L'heure espanole, with Karan Armstrong) to 1974. He debuted at the Metropolitan Opera in Les Troyens in 1973 (as Iopas, opposite Jon Vickers and Shirley Verrett), subsequently appearing at the Met in another 102 performances in operas including La clemenza di Tito, Les contes d'Hoffmann, Elektra, Fidelio, Lulu, Die Meistersinger von Nürnberg, The Rise and Fall of the City of Mahagonny, Salome,  Die Zauberflöte and Wozzeck. He made his first appearance at the Salzburg Festival in 1975. In 1979, he sang Alwa at the first performance of the 3 act version of Lulu at the Paris Opera. He played the title role in Der Zwerg in Hamburg in 1981. In 1983, he created the role of the Leper in Saint François d'Assise.

Partial discography

 Haydn: Harmoniemesse (Blegen; Bernstein, 1973) Sony
 Mozart: Don Giovanni (Raimondi; Maazel, 1978) Sony
 Berg: Lulu (Stratas; Boulez, 1979) Deutsche Grammophon
 Berlioz: La damnation de Faust (von Stade, van Dam; Solti, 1981) Decca | Berlioz: La damnation de Faust (Georg Solti recording)
 Messiaen: Saint François d'Assise (van Dam; Ozawa, 1983) Cybélia
 Henze: The Bassarids (Armstrong; Albrecht, 1986) koch schwann
 Mussorgsky: Boris Godounov (Vishnevskaya, Raimondi, Plishka; Rostropovich, 1987) Erato
 Strauss: Salome (Malfitano, Schwarz, Terfel; Dohnányi, 1994) Decca

Selected filmography
 Mozart: Don Giovanni (Raimondi; Maazel, Losey, 1979)
 Berg: Lulu (Migenes; Levine, Dexter, 1980, Metropolitan Opera)
 Strauss: Salome (Ewing, Knight, Devlin; Downes, Hall, 1992, Covent Garden)
 Strauss: Salome (Malfitano, Silja, Terfel; Dohnányi, Bondy, 1997, Covent Garden)

References

External links 

1938 births
Living people
American operatic tenors
20th-century American male opera singers
People from Berks County, Pennsylvania
Singers from Pennsylvania
Classical musicians from Pennsylvania